Ulla Sandulf (born 30 January 1943) is a Swedish former tennis player.

A Left-handed player, Sandulf was the Swedish outdoor champion in 1963 and featured in her country's debut Federation Cup tie against Canada the following year.

Sandulf made it through to the third round of the 1964 Wimbledon Championships.

See also
List of Sweden Fed Cup team representatives

References

External links
 
 

1943 births
Living people
Swedish female tennis players